Mys is a rural locality (a village) in Roksomskoye Rural Settlement, Vashkinsky District, Vologda Oblast, Russia. The population was 5 as of 2002.

Geography 
The distance to Lipin Bor is 25 km, to Parfenovo is 1 km. Vasyutino is the nearest rural locality.

References 

Rural localities in Vashkinsky District